Evisceration Plague is the eleventh studio album by American death metal band Cannibal Corpse. Released on February 3, 2009 by Metal Blade Records, the album was produced at Mana Recording Studios by Hate Eternal guitarist Erik Rutan.

The album entered the US Billboard 200 at number 66, selling 9,600 copies its first week.

Background 
Bassist Alex Webster said about the record:

In another interview with Terrorizer magazine, drummer Paul Mazurkiewicz stated his thoughts on the album saying: "I think working with Erik again has definitely brought things up a little for us. I mean all the band were involved in the writing process of this album along with Rutan and so I think this one's a tad more individual than Kill."

Release and promotion 
The cover art was released December 14 and samples were made available through Amazon.com. The album was released with a bonus track in Europe and DVD as a deluxe edition. An autographed version of the album is now available for pre-order on the Metal Blade Records website.

It is the fifth Cannibal Corpse album to contain a title track (following Butchered at Birth, The Bleeding, Gallery of Suicide and The Wretched Spawn) and a video was produced for the song.

They also released a comic book where each song has its own comic.

A video for the song "Evisceration Plague" was released on May 9, 2009 on the YouTube account of Metal Blade Records.

A video was produced for the song "Priests of Sodom". The video was released on March 25, 2010.

Reception

Track listing

Credits 
Writing, performance and production credits are adapted from the album liner notes.

Personnel

Cannibal Corpse 
 George "Corpsegrinder" Fisher – vocals
 Pat O'Brien – lead guitar
 Rob Barrett – rhythm guitar
 Alex Webster – bass
 Paul Mazurkiewicz – drums

Guest musicians 
 Erik Rutan – guitar solo on "Unnatural"

Production 
 Erik Rutan – production, engineering, mixing
 Shawn Ohtani – additional engineering
 Brian Elliot – additional engineering
 Mike McCracken – studio drum assistant
 Alan Douches – mastering
 Neil Kernon – production, mixing only "Skull Fragment Armor"
 Justion Leeah – engineering only "Skull Fragment Armor"

Artwork and design 
 Vincent Locke – cover art
 Brian Ames – design
 Alex Solca – photography

Studios 
 Mana Recording Studios, St. Petersburg, FL, USA – recording, mixing
 West Westside Music – mastering
 Sonic Ranch, Tornillo, TX, USA – recording only "Skull Fragment Armor"

Charts

References

External links 
 
 Evisceration Plague at Metal Blade Records

2009 albums
Albums produced by Erik Rutan
Cannibal Corpse albums
Metal Blade Records albums